According to the USGS GNIS, the state of Washington in the United States has 15 peaks named Bald Mountain.

Mountains of Washington (state)